Plectrohyla calvata is a frog in the family Hylidae, endemic to habitats in Honduras.  Scientists have seen it between 1900 and 2500 meters above sea level in cloud forests.

Original description

References

Frogs of North America
Endemic fauna of Honduras
Amphibians described in 2017
calvata